This List of hills of Mecklenburg-Vorpommern shows a selection of hills in the German federal state of Mecklenburg-Vorpommern – sorted by height in metres above sea level (NN):

Name, Height, Location (District(s), landscape region)

 Helpt Hills (Helpter Berge, 179 m), highest point in Mecklenburgische Seenplatte District, near Woldegk
 Ruhner Berg (176.6 m), highest point in Ludwigslust-Parchim District, Ruhn Hills, near Marnitz
 Dachsberg (172.4 m), Ludwigslust-Parchim District, Ruhn Hills
 Vogelkirsche (166.0 m), Mecklenburgische Seenplatte District, hill not far from Schlicht near Feldberg
 Piekberg (160.9 m), highest hill in Vorpommern-Rügen District and Rügen Island, Jasmund National Park
 Petersilienberg (154 m), Mecklenburgische Seenplatte District, Helpt Hills
 Unnamed hill not far from Matzdorf (153.1 m), Mecklenburgische Seenplatte District, highest hill in the Brohme Hills
 Trenzer Berg (150.6 m), Vorpommern-Rügen District, Jasmund National Park, Rügen Island
 Boner Berg (147.2 m), Vorpommern-Rügen District, Jasmund National Park, Rügen Island
 Langer Berg (147 m), highest point in Rostock District, Hohe Burg and Schwarzer See nature reserve, Rugberg
 Rosenberg (147 m), Mecklenburgische Seenplatte District, southwest of Feldberg
 Hohe Burg (144 m), Rostock District, Hohe Burg and Schwarzer See nature reserve, Rugberg
 Hirschberg (143.5 m), Mecklenburgische Seenplatte District, Müritz National Park
 Reiherberg (143 m), Mecklenburgische Seenplatte District, Feldberger Seenlandschaft
 Luderberg?, unnamed hill not far from Klepelshagen (133.2 m), highest point in Vorpommern-Greifswald District, Brohme Hills
 Brohmer Berg (131 m), Mecklenburgische Seenplatte District, Brohme Hills
 Diedrichshagener Berg (129.7 m), highest point in Rostock District, Kühlung 
 Scharfer Berg (129 m), Mecklenburgische Seenplatte District, not far from Woldegk
 Schmooksberg (127 m), Rostock District, between Teterow and Laage 
 Wulfsberg (127 m), Ludwigslust-Parchim District, Ruhn Hills
 Langer Berg (124 m), Ludwigslust-Parchim District, southwest of Parchim
 Serrahn Hills (124.2 m), Mecklenburgische Seenplatte District, Müritz National Park 
 Schlanker Berg (123.7 m), Mecklenburgische Seenplatte District, Mecklenburg Switzerland
 Hardtberg (123 m), Rostock District, Mecklenburg Switzerland
 Klebensberg (122 m), Ludwigslust-Parchim District, Ruhn Hills
 Buchberg (118 m), Ludwigslust-Parchim District, southwest of the Plauer See (gives its name to the new municipality of Buchberg)
 Lünenberg (118 m), highest point in Nordwestmecklenburg District, parish of Passee
 Königsstuhl (117.9 m), Vorpommern-Rügen District, Jasmund National Park, Jasmund, Rügen
 Strelitzer Berg (116.6 m), Mecklenburgische Seenplatte District, Müritz National Park 
 Ostberg (115 m), Rostock District, Mecklenburg Switzerland
 Ziegler Berg (113.1 m), Vorpommern-Greifswald District, Brohme Hills
 Heideberg (112.9 m), Nordwestmecklenburg District, east of Grevesmühlen
 Kalkberg (112 m), Rostock District, Kühlung 
 Mohrberg (111 m), Mecklenburgische Seenplatte District, Mecklenburgische Seenplatte
 Unnamed hill near Altenhagen (110.3 m), Mecklenburgische Seenplatte District
 Großer Jägerberg (110 m), Rostock District, Kühlung
 Krähenberg (110 m), Rostock District, Carinerland municipality
 Zimmerberg (110 m), Rostock District, Kühlung 
 Tempelberg (107 m), Vorpommern-Rügen District, Southeast Rügen Bosphere Reserve, Granitz, Rügen
 Tabaksberg (106 m), Rostock District, Mecklenburg Switzerland
 Rotemoorberg (105.1 m), Mecklenburgische Seenplatte District, near Wesenberg
 Fuchsberg (104 m), Nordwestmecklenburg District (gives its name to the Fuchsberg Motorway Services)
 Granziner Heidberge (102.8 m), near Greven, Ludwigslust-Parchim District
 Primerberg (102 m), Rostock District, Mecklenburg Switzerland
 Galgenberg (101 m), Mecklenburgische Seenplatte District, Müritz National Park
 Käflingsberg (100.2 m), Mecklenburgische Seenplatte District, Müritz National Park
 Iserberg (100 m), Nordwestmecklenburg District, east of Grevesmühlen 
 Jägerberg (100 m), Rostock District, Kühlung 
 Röthelberg (98 m), Rostock District, Mecklenburg Switzerland
 Hütterberg (95.7 m), Nordwestmecklenburg District
 Hellberg (93 m), Nordwestmecklenburg District, near Roggendorf
 Rugard (90 m), Vorpommern-Rügen District, near Bergen on Rügen, Jasmund, Rügen
 Weinberg (86.1 m), Neumühle, highest point in the borough of Schwerin
 Schlossberg (86 m), Rostock District, Kühlung
 Höchster Berg (84.2 m), Rostock District 
 Budenberg (83 m), Rostock District, Kühlung
 Franzosenberg (82 m), Rostock District, Kühlung
 Fuchsberg (76.5 m), Klein Rogahn, Ludwigslust-Parchim District 
 Unnamed hill (72.8 m), in the Göhrener Tannen, Schwerin
 Schluckswiekberg (72.5 m), Vorpommern-Rügen District, Dornbusch, highest hill on the island of Hiddensee
 Steinberg (71 m), Ludwigslust-Parchim District, highest hill in the Wanzeberg
 Dolger Berg (71 m), Prisannewitz, Rostock District
 Golm (69 m), highest hill on island of Usedom, Vorpommern-Greifswald District, near Kamminke and Garz 
 Schever Barg (69 m), Rostock District, near Groß Grabow
 Freundschaftshöhe (66 m), Rostock District, near Rostock in Rostock Switzerland
 Streckelsberg (58 m), Vorpommern-Greifswald District, Usedom Island, near Koserow
 Langer Berg (55 m), Vorpommern-Rügen District, parish of Marlow-Gresenhorst
 Hellberg (54.0 m), parish of Sarnow, Vorpommern-Greifswald District
 Wahrenskenberg (52.2 m), Mecklenburgische Seenplatte District, parish of Basedow-Gessin
 Ziesaberg (49 m), Vorpommern-Greifswald District, near Wolgast

Mecklenburg-Vorpommern
!
Hil